Żmudziński is a surname. Notable people with the surname include:

Adam Żmudziński (born 1956), Polish bridge player
Tadeusz Żmudziński (1924–1992), Polish pianist and educator
Jakob Żmudziński (born 2009), German chess player

Polish-language surnames